Noah D. Davis (born April 22, 1997) is an American professional baseball pitcher for the Colorado Rockies of Major League Baseball (MLB). He played college baseball at the University of California, Santa Barbara, and was selected by the Cincinnati Reds in the 11th round of the 2018 Major League Baseball draft. He made his MLB debut in 2022 with the Rockies.

Early life and amateur career
Davis was born in Newport Beach, California, to Eric and Ashley Davis, and is Jewish. He attended Huntington Beach High School in Huntington Beach, California. He was First Team All-Sunset League in  2014 and 2015. He was 12–0 with a 1.27 earned run average (ERA) in his junior season, in which he was First Team All-California and All-County, and won the 2015 CIF Southern Section Division I Championship, throwing a complete-game four-hitter with 10 strikeouts in the title game.

Davis enrolled at the University of California, Santa Barbara, where he played college baseball for the UC Santa Barbara Gauchos while majoring in environmental studies. In 2016 he was named Big West Freshman of the Year. In 2017, he played collegiate summer baseball with the Cotuit Kettleers of the Cape Cod Baseball League. In 2018, he pitched in three games before undergoing Tommy John surgery in March. He was still selected by the Cincinnati Reds in the 11th round of the 2018 Major League Baseball draft, and signed for a signing bonus of $127,500.

Professional career

Cincinnati Reds
Davis made his professional debut, after rehabbing from his surgery, in June 2019 with the Arizona League Reds, and was promoted to the Billings Mustangs during the season. Over  innings between the two teams, in 13 starts he went 1–3 with a 3.19 ERA and 35 strikeouts. He did not play a game in 2020 due to the cancellation of the minor league season. He began 2021 with the Dayton Dragons.

Colorado Rockies
On July 28, 2021, the Reds traded Davis and pitcher Case Williams to the Colorado Rockies for reliever Mychal Givens. He was assigned to the Spokane Indians, where he ended the season. Over 19 starts between Dayton and Spokane, he went 6–7 with two complete games and a 3.60 ERA, 76 hits, and 106 strikeouts in 100 innings, a 9.5 K/9 rate. The Rockies added him to their 40-man roster after the 2021 season.

Davis began the 2022 season pitching for the Hartford Yard Goats of the Class AA Eastern League, with whom he was 8–8 with a 5.54 ERA in 26 starts, in which he had 152 strikeouts (3rd in the league) in  innings (10.3 strikeouts/9 IP). He started one game for the Class AAA Albuquerque Isotopes of the Pacific Coast League, and was 0–0 with a 1.93 ERA. On September 16, 2022, the Rockies called him up to the major leagues. Colorado manager Bud Black said that Davis could be a starter for the Rockies in the near future, if he can adapt to major league hitters. He made his major league debut on October 5, 2022.

Pitching repertoire
As of January 2022 his pitching repertoire with a short-arm, low-slot delivery was a slider averaging about 93 mph and touching 62 mph, a curveball about 77 mph, and an occasional changeup.

See also
 List of select Jewish Major League Baseball players

References

External links

1997 births
Living people
Sportspeople from Newport Beach, California
Baseball players from California
21st-century American Jews
Jewish American baseball players
Jewish Major League Baseball players
Major League Baseball pitchers
Colorado Rockies players
UC Santa Barbara Gauchos baseball players
Cotuit Kettleers players
Arizona League Reds players
Billings Mustangs players
Spokane Indians players
Dayton Dragons players
Hartford Yard Goats players
Albuquerque Isotopes players